U.S. Route 169 (US 169) is a north-south U.S highway that currently runs for 966 miles (1,555 km) from the city of Virginia, Minnesota, to Tulsa, Oklahoma, at Memorial Drive.

Route description

Oklahoma

US 169 is a major north–south highway spanning  in Oklahoma. The southern terminus for US 169 is Memorial Drive. The highway connects Tulsa, Oklahoma to the south with the Kansas state border to the north at South Coffeyville, Oklahoma. US 169 travels through Tulsa, Rogers, and Nowata counties.

US 169 has undergone several widening projects that have brought US 169 to freeway and expressway standards. The highway is two lanes between Talala, Oklahoma and South Coffeyville except for a short four-lane portion north of Nowata, Oklahoma and ending at State Highway 28.

An Alternate US 169 passes through Nowata following the original path of US 169. The alternate route begins at the intersection of Choctaw Avenue and reconnects with US 169 south of Nowata at its intersection with Maple Street.

In January 2005, Oklahoma Department of Transportation began a $16.8 million widening project on a mile-long stretch of US 169 (officially named 'Pearl Harbor Memorial Expressway', although this name is rarely used by Tulsans) from Interstate 244 (I-244) to I-44. The project widened the highway from four to six lanes, adding one lane in each direction. The project was completed in April 2006. This stretch of US 169 is traveled by approximately 106,000 vehicles per day.

Kansas

US 169 enters the state at Coffeyville as a four-lane road, and is a four-lane highway for about  till the edge of the Coffeyville Industrial Park. A segment runs around Chanute is a  freeway with fully controlled access with center concrete barrier, with two lanes in each direction. The intersection immediately south of Garnett used to be a "braided" intersection with Stop and Yield signs. It was identified as a high crash location in 2001, and was rebuilt as a roundabout that opened in April 2006. The Kansas Department of Transportation is rebuilding or planning to rebuild several other rural intersections as roundabouts for increased safety. In Garnett, 6th Avenue (from US 169 to US 59 is also known as Business US 169. Going south, it veers off from US 169 about a mile and a half north of the US 169/US 59/K-31 roundabout intersection and travels west and south on 6th Avenue from US 169 to US 59/K-31 (Maple St.) before turning south onto US 59/K-31 and running concurrently with them, ending at the US 169/US 59/K-31 roundabout intersection. At Osawatomie the road becomes a full freeway; as well as, running concurrent with K-7. In southern Johnson County 169 becomes an expressway until its junction with I-35 in Olathe.

From this point to the Missouri state line, US 169 alternates between freeways and surface streets. It follows I-35 to Shawnee Mission Parkway in Overland Park, then travels east to Rainbow Boulevard. US 169 then follows surface streets to its junction with I-70 near downtown Kansas City. US 169 and I-70 enter Missouri together just after crossing the Kansas River.

Missouri

US 169 exits I-70 shortly after both roads enter Missouri via the Lewis and Clark Viaduct. It crosses the Missouri River by the Buck O'Neil Bridge and serves Kansas City Downtown Airport.  Northbound, US 169 becomes a freeway at 5th Street south of the Missouri River, however southbound it ceases being a freeway north of the airport. An at-grade private driveway exists just south of the intersection with Route 9 as well as for airport access. At the northern end of the city an intersection is being reconstructed at NE 108th Street with completion in November 2013. Once this is completed it will be a freeway through I-435. This segment is also known as Arrowhead Trafficway, although this road neither passes nor approaches Arrowhead Stadium.

US 169 is a four-lane rural expressway until it reaches Smithville, where it reverts to a two-lane rural highway. In St. Joseph, it forms most of the Belt Highway, a major commercial strip on the eastern edge of town, paralleling just inside I-29. US 169 angles northeastward out of St. Joseph, passing through many rural communities before exiting Missouri north of Grant City.

US 169 intersects I-29 three times in Missouri: once in Gladstone, and twice in St. Joseph.

Iowa

US 169 enters Iowa just south of Redding. It intersects I-80 near De Soto. US 169 becomes an expressway at US 20, south of Fort Dodge. At Iowa Highway 7 on the northwest side of Fort Dodge it reverts to a two-lane highway again. This is changing, however, as a two-phase, $11 million project began in the spring of 2010 to widen the route to four lanes from Fort Dodge to Humboldt. US 169 passes through Humboldt and Algona before it leaves Iowa north of Lakota.

Minnesota

US 169 is a major north–south highway in Minnesota. It enters the state at Elmore. Shortly after, it junctions with I-90 at Blue Earth. It passes Mankato, crossing the Minnesota River. Between Mankato and the Twin Cities, US 169 is largely a rural highway. Before entering Le Sueur, US 169 crosses the Minnesota River again. At Shakopee, US 169 becomes a freeway, crossing the Minnesota River for a third time. The freeway ends in Champlin. US 169 crosses the Mississippi River at Anoka and follows concurrently with US 10 to Elk River, where US 169 splits off northbound through central Minnesota. The rest of the route in Minnesota is largely rural. The route passes the western side of Mille Lacs Lake. It terminates at US 53 in Virginia, in the Iron Range.

History

In Kansas, US 169 used run concurrent with US 69 from I-35 through Downtown Kansas City, Kansas and the Fairfax District across the Platte Purchase Bridge to I-635 until splitting at I-29 in Missouri.

In Missouri, US 169 replaced Route 1 from Kansas City to St. Joseph, Route 4 from St. Joseph to Stanberry, and all of Route 29 from Stanberry to Iowa. The part of Route 1 north of Kansas City had been Route 33 south of, and Route 50 north of, Grayson from 1922 to 1926.

Prior to 2008, US 169 traveled east on I-435 in Lenexa and Overland Park, Kansas, and then it traveled north on Metcalf Avenue.

Prior to 1981, US 169 entered Minneapolis, Minnesota.

Major intersections
Oklahoma
  in Tulsa. The highways travel concurrently through Tulsa.
  in Tulsa
  in Tulsa
  in Nowata
Kansas
  in Coffeyville. The highways travel concurrently to east-northeast of Coffeyville.
  south-southwest of Cherryvale.
  north-northeast of Cherryvale
  east of Iola
  northeast of Welda. The highways travel concurrently to south of Garnett.
  in Olathe. I-35/US 169 travels concurrently to Merriam. US 50/US 169 travels concurrently to Lenexa. US 56/US 169 travels concurrently to the Westwood–Mission Woods city line.
  in Lenexa
  in Lenexa. The highways travel concurrently to Overland Park.
  in Kansas City
  in Kansas City. I-70/US 24/US 40/US 169 travels concurrently to Kansas City, Missouri.
Missouri
  in Kansas City. The highways travel concurrently through Kansas City.
  southeast of Northmoor
  in Gladstone
  in Kansas City
  in St. Joseph
  in St. Joseph
  in St. Joseph
  in Stanberry. The highways travel concurrently to north-northwest of Darlington.
Iowa
  in Afton. The highways travel concurrently to west of Thayer.
  in De Soto. US 6/US 169 travels concurrently to Adel.
  in Ogden. The highways travel concurrently to east-southeast of Beaver.
  south of Fort Dodge
  in Algona
Minnesota
  in Blue Earth
  on the North Mankato–Mankato city line
  in Bloomington
  on the Eden Prairie–Edina city line
  on the St. Louis Park–Golden Valley city line
  on the Maple Grove–Brooklyn Park city line
  in Anoka. The highways travel concurrently to Elk River.
  in Grand Rapids. The highways travel concurrently through Grand Rapids.
  in Virginia

See also
Special routes of U.S. Route 169

References

External links

 Endpoints of U.S. Highway 169

 
69-1
69-1
69-1
1